Liotina semiclathratula is a species of small sea snail, a marine gastropod mollusk, in the family Liotiidae.

Description
The size of the shell varies between 5 mm and 15 mm.
The whitish shell has a depressed turbinate shape. It is spirally costate, with  the costae slightly tuberculate above. The suture is channeled. The outer lip is crenately varicose. The large umbilicus is bicarinate within and crenulately margined.

Distribution
This marine species occurs off Japan, the Amur region and the Philippines.

References

Notes 

 Higo, S., Callomon, P. & Goto, Y. (1999). Catalogue and bibliography of the marine shell-bearing Mollusca of Japan. Osaka. : Elle Scientific Publications. 749 pp.

External links
 To World Register of Marine Species
 

semiclathratula
Gastropods described in 1862